J. Edward Guinan (6 March 1936 – 26 December 2014) was a former stock trader who became a Paulist priest and was the founder Washington, D.C.,'s Community for Creative Non-Violence in 1970. Guinan was the first to put the initiative for DC Statehood on the ballot, and it won all wards of the District to kickstart the statehood movement.

Early life and education
Guinan was born in 1936 in Denver, Colorado, the son of Edward Thomas Guinan and Gabrielle Huot Guinan (Irish and French origins). He attended Loyola Grade School in Denver from 1942 to 1950 and Saint Joseph High School from 1950 to 1954. He served in the Navy before going to college. After the Navy, he went to University of Colorado Boulder from 1957 to 1960.

U.S. Navy Service
Guinan served in the U.S. Naval Air Force from 1954 to 1957, at the U.S. Naval Air Station Barbers Point, Oahu, Hawaii.

Stock trader
After college, where he majored in finance, he became a stock trader in San Francisco, and was a member of the New York, American, and Pacific Coast stock exchanges. He was also a member of the National and San Francisco Traders Associations. He worked for Schwabacher & J. W. Strauss & Co. Investment Bankers, a third-market firm. Upon discerning the call to join the Paulist Fathers, however, he left the financial world, and gave his wealth away. His knowledge of international finance informed his future work as a community founder and DC statehood initiator.

Religious life
He attended St. Paul's College, Washington, D.C., the Paulist Major Seminary, from 1966 to 1971, completing studies in Philosophy and Theology. He was ordained a deacon in 1970 at the Cathedral of Mary Our Queen, Baltimore. His ordination as a priest was on January 16, 1971, at St. Paul the Apostle Church (Manhattan). From 1971 to 1974 he was active in the priesthood, and became the Chaplain of George Washington University in Washington, D.C.

Community for Creative Non-Violence (CCNV)
As a priest at George Washington University, he was involved in the antiwar movement. His passionate sermons on peace drew large crowds.  He believed that there was a necessity to have a place of dialogue and input where people could think through and have significant input on city issues, the military industrial complex, and the Vietnam War. To answer this need, he and a group of graduate student peace activists founded the Community for Creative Non-Violence in two houses, one directly on Washington Circle ("23rd Street House" at 936 23rd Street NW), and a second house at 21st and N. This all grew out of the worship community of George Washington University.

Summer of Contemplation and Resistance
In the spring of 1972, Guinan persuaded his religious congregation to allow him to host peace activists at the Paulist Fathers Minor Seminary in Oak Ridge, New Jersey. The two-month "Summer of Contemplation and Resistance" drew over 1,500 people who organized and coalesced themselves into a movement. During this summer he met his future wife, Kathleen Thorsby, and invited her to work with the other activists in Washington, DC. Beyond the antiwar movement,  he envisioned working on system issues affecting poverty and racism. The group wanted to feed hungry people, and opened a new house at 1008 K Street Northwest.

Zacchaeus Community Kitchen
At 905 New York Avenue NW, the group established Zacchaeus Community Kitchen in 1972. They placed it just six blocks from the White House to highlight the need. Over 500 people a day came from the beginning. Mother Teresa, whom they barely knew because this was seven years before the Nobel Prize, came with her friend Eileen Egan, the latter of whom was also friendly with Fr. Guinan. They served the first bowls of soup, eating with the first guests. Dorothy Day also visited from time to time, and was closely involved with the growth of the communities. Hélder Câmara the self-identified socialist Bishop and advocate of Liberation Theology visited as well. The Guinans also founded the Zacchaeus Free Clinic and recruited Jack Bresette, MD. The Zacchaeus organizations later merged to become Bread for the City.

Pax Christi USA
Guinan was the founding Director of Pax Christi USA, and became its first General Secretary.  The founding assembly was held at George Washington University in October 1973. Many of the 350 participants had also joined pray-ins outside the nearby Nixon White House that summer. Guinan wished to counter Just war theory, using Pope John XXIII's Pacem in terris encyclical of 1963 to, in his words, "permeate the Roman Catholic consciousness and structure with its rich tradition of Catholic pacifism and gospel nonviolence which has always been with us, but which has for many centuries been overlaid with layers of argumentation and rhetoric and is very difficult to uncover." Dorothy Day spoke at that first meeting, saying the group was needed to counter U.S. involvement in Indochina. They adopted two resolutions, (1) to support the United Farm Workers of America in their "struggle for justice" during the ongoing lettuce and grape boycotts, and (2) countering the military's intention to form Reserve Officers' Training Corps (ROTC) groups on college campuses, with a focus on establishing peace programs rather than expending energy to fight ROTC. The latter became a point of conversation with his friend, Jesuit Richard McSorley of Georgetown University, who publicly and actively protested against ROTC at Georgetown. 

Pax Christi USA differed from similar groups such as Catholic Peace Fellowship (Jim Forest) because, according to Guinan in the NCR cited above, it had "consultative status with the United Nations." Bishop Carroll Thomas Dozier of Memphis and Bishop Thomas Gumbleton of Detroit sent messages of support to the assembly, as did Cardinal Bernardus Johannes Alfrink of Utrecht, honorary chairman of the international body.

Guinan's participation only lasted a year, until the summer of 1974. He had become preoccupied with his fast (see the fasting section, TK) and was less drawn to day-to-day activities. Bishop Dozier was concerned both about the optics of the fast, and the protest of Henry Kissinger (see the Kissinger section, TK). Guinan's resignation letter was also a key to his personality. "I function very poorly in organizations and institutions, possibly an instinctual disbelief in the form; I abhor majority and distrust consensus, possibly an exaggerated belief in the individual; I oppose sacrificing the person for the greater Glory of God, which has brought me to the precipice of our present disagreement."

DC Statehood
Guinan saw a statehood initiative as a way of bringing the benefits of being a state to the electorate, especially the poor. According to historians Chris Myers Asch and George Derek Musgrove in their award-winning book Chocolate City: A History of Race and Democracy in the Nation's Capital, the statehood movement restarted after the death of Julius Hobson, when Ed Guinan put statehood on the 1980 ballot as an initiative. He did not ask anyone in the self-determination movement, but instead drafted a proposal for statehood "that required a four-step process: an up-or-down vote on the question of statehood, the election of forty-five delegates to a constitutional convention, the submission of a constitution to the voters for ratification, and, finally, an application to Congress for admission to the Union as the fifty-first state." Asch and Musgrove show how Guinan hoped to establish a grassroots activist network "that would displace establishment leaders and empower citizens to address D.C.'s most pressing needs." The ballot question won all wards.

Personal life
After Ed Guinan met Kathleen Thorsby, who had come to Washington, D.C., for the "Summer of Contemplation and Resistance" that Guinan advertised in Catholic Worker (newspaper), he asked the Paulists for permission to become the first married priest, and further petitioned the Vatican to abolish the rule that priests cannot marry. His request was denied by Pope Paul VI, so he left the Paulists. He and Thorsby married in 1974, she took his surname, and they remained a married team until his death. Together they founded Zacchaeus Community Kitchen, and other cornerstone organizations that serve the poor. Kathleen Guinan has been CEO of Crossway Community since 1990.  She is also a founder of Rachael's Women's Center.

References

External links
 https://sojo.net/articles/remembering-j-edward-guinan-passionate-advocate-dc-s-most-vulnerable, from Sojourners
 Washington Post obituary: https://www.washingtonpost.com/local/obituaries/j-edward-guinan-former-catholic-priest-who-ministered-to-the-homeless-dies-at-78/2015/01/03/7b2c33fa-92e8-11e4-a900-9960214d4cd7_story.html
 From "DC Statehood Yes We Can," http://dcstatehoodyeswecan.org/j/index.php?option=com_content&view=article&id=454:dc-statehood-champion-j-edward-guinan-dies&catid=1:latest-news&Itemid=89
 Obituary from Pax Christi USA: https://paxchristiusa.org/2015/01/05/obituary-ed-guinan-first-general-secretary-of-pax-christi-usa-passed-away-on-dec-26/
 Tweet from Free DC Now: https://twitter.com/FreeDCnow/status/1148983975924445186

1936 births
2014 deaths
20th-century American Roman Catholic priests
American anti-war activists
American anti–Vietnam War activists
American Christian pacifists
American people of Irish descent
American people of French descent
Christian radicals
Homelessness activists
Nonviolence advocates
Paulist Order
People from Denver
People from Washington, D.C.
Roman Catholic activists
United States Navy sailors